(former name; Tomomi Mitsui, 三井 ともみ) is a former Japanese football player. She played for Japan national team.

Club career
Miyamoto was born in Sagamihara on December 31, 1978. After graduating from high school, she joined Prima Ham FC Kunoichi (later Iga FC Kunoichi) in 1997. She was selected Best Eleven 2 times (1999 and 2003). She took maternity leave in 2005 season. She came back from 2006 season. In 2009, she moved to TEPCO Mareeze. In 2011, she returned to Iga FC Kunoichi. End of 2012 season, she retired.

National team career
On June 8, 1997, when Miyamoto was 18 years old, she debuted and scored a goal for Japan national team against China. She was a member of Japan for 1999, 2003, 2007 World Cup and 2004 Summer Olympics. She also played at 1997, 1999, 2003 AFC Championship, 1998 and 2002 Asian Games. She played 77 games and scored 13 goals for Japan until 2007.

Personal life
Miyamoto got married and changed her name to Tomomi Miyamoto (宮本 ともみ) from Tomomi Mitsui (三井 ともみ) in 2002. In May 2005, she bore a children. So, she took maternity leave in 2005 season.

National team statistics

International goals

References

External links
 

1978 births
Living people
People from Sagamihara
Association football people from Kanagawa Prefecture
Japanese women's footballers
Japan women's international footballers
Nadeshiko League players
Iga FC Kunoichi players
TEPCO Mareeze players
1999 FIFA Women's World Cup players
2003 FIFA Women's World Cup players
2007 FIFA Women's World Cup players
Olympic footballers of Japan
Footballers at the 2004 Summer Olympics
Asian Games medalists in football
Footballers at the 1998 Asian Games
Footballers at the 2002 Asian Games
Women's association football midfielders
Asian Games bronze medalists for Japan
Medalists at the 1998 Asian Games
Medalists at the 2002 Asian Games